The Red Deer City Council is the governing body for the city of Red Deer, Alberta, Canada. The council consists of the mayor and eight councillors.

Current Red Deer City Council 
Ken Johnston, mayor
Michael Dawe, councillor
Cindy Jefferies, councillor
Dianne Wyntjes, councillor
Lawrence Lee, councillor
Bruce Buruma, councillor
Vesna Higham, councillor
Kraymer Barnstable, councillor
Victor Doerksen, councillor

See also 
List of mayors of Red Deer, Alberta

References

External links 
Red Deer City Council website

Municipal councils in Alberta
Politics of Red Deer, Alberta